World Series of Fighting 29: Gaethje vs. Foster was a mixed martial arts event held on  at the Bank of Colorado Arena in Greeley, Colorado.

Background
The event was headlined by a WSOF Lightweight Championship fight between champion Justin Gaethje and Brian Foster. It was originally expected to take place at Budweiser Events Center in Loveland, Colorado, but on January 23, WSOF announced that it would take place at Bank of Colorado Arena in Greeley, Colorado.

Results

See also
List of WSOF events
List of WSOF champions

References

World Series of Fighting events
2016 in mixed martial arts